Radical 10 or radical legs (儿部) meaning "legs" is one of 23 of the 214  Kangxi radicals that are composed of 2 strokes.
 
In the Kangxi Dictionary, there are 52 characters (out of 49,030) to be found under this radical.

 is also the 14th indexing component in the Table of Indexing Chinese Character Components predominantly adopted by Simplified Chinese dictionaries published in mainland China.

Evolution

Derived characters

Literature 

Leyi Li: “Tracing the Roots of Chinese Characters: 500 Cases”. Beijing 1993,

External links

Unihan Database - U+513F

010
014